The knockout stage was the second and final stage of the 2006 FIFA World Cup, following the group stage. The top two teams from each group (16 in total) advance to the knockout stage to compete in a single-elimination style tournament. A match was played between the two losing teams of the semi-finals to determine which team finished in third place.

All times local (CEST/UTC+2)

Qualified teams
The top two placed teams from each of the eight groups qualified for the knockout stage.

Bracket

Round of 16

Germany vs Sweden
Germany progressed thanks to two goals from Lukas Podolski inside the opening 12 minutes. His first was in the fourth minute; German captain Michael Ballack sent a pass to Miroslav Klose,  who was tackled by goalkeeper Andreas Isaksson, only for an onrushing Podolski to turn the ball in. Eight minutes later, a pass from Klose found Podolski, who scored his second goal. On 35 minutes, Teddy Lučić received a second yellow card for a foul on Klose. In the 52nd minute, Henrik Larsson won a penalty for Sweden when he was challenged by Christoph Metzelder, only for Larsson himself to shoot the ball over the crossbar. Germany held out for a 2–0 win.

Argentina vs Mexico

England vs Ecuador

Portugal vs Netherlands

Italy vs Australia

Switzerland vs Ukraine
Despite their early elimination, Switzerland became the first team in the history of the FIFA World Cup to leave an edition of the tournament without conceding a single goal.

Brazil vs Ghana

Spain vs France

Quarter-finals

Germany vs Argentina

Italy vs Ukraine

England vs Portugal

Brazil vs France

Defending world champions Brazil went out in the quarter-finals after Zinedine Zidane found an unmarked Thierry Henry from a free kick, the striker having been given a free run at the ball after his marker, Roberto Carlos, stopped to tie his shoe.

Semi-finals

Germany vs Italy

Portugal vs France

Third place play-off

Final

Notes

References

2006 FIFA World Cup
2006
Mexico at the 2006 FIFA World Cup
Argentina at the 2006 FIFA World Cup
Germany at the 2006 FIFA World Cup
Italy at the 2006 FIFA World Cup
France at the 2006 FIFA World Cup
Brazil at the 2006 FIFA World Cup
Spain at the 2006 FIFA World Cup
Portugal at the 2006 FIFA World Cup
England at the 2006 FIFA World Cup
Netherlands at the 2006 FIFA World Cup
Switzerland at the 2006 FIFA World Cup
Ukraine at the 2006 FIFA World Cup
Sweden at the 2006 FIFA World Cup
Ecuador at the 2006 FIFA World Cup
Australia at the 2006 FIFA World Cup
Ghana at the 2006 FIFA World Cup